The 2019–20 season was Bolton Wanderers' first season back in League One following their relegation last season from the Championship. Along with the league the club also participated in the FA Cup, EFL Cup, and the EFL Trophy. The season covered the period from 1 July 2019 to 30 June 2020.

Background 
Throughout the 2018–19 Championship season Bolton faced financial difficulties. After the collapse of the permanent signing of on-loan striker Christian Doidge, Forest Green Rovers commenced legal action over lost earnings. In February 2019, Bolton were issued a winding-up petition by HM Revenue & Customs (HMRC) which was subsequently adjourned, first until April, and then again until the end of the season as their search for a new owner continued. Due to the financial difficulties, the training ground temporarily closed in March 2019, and games against Ipswich, Middlesbrough and Aston Villa were threatened with postponement or being played behind closed doors as the local council Safety Advisory Group (SAG) threatened to revoke the stadium safety certificate. The Bolton Whites Hotel, owned by Ken Anderson, was also issued with a winding-up petition in March 2019 (it closed on 1 May and went into administration on 14 May). The team was relegated to League One in April after a 23rd-place finish. In a further development on 26 April, the home match against Brentford was called off by the English Football League 16 hours before kick off after Bolton's players, supported by the Professional Footballers' Association, refused to play until they had received their unpaid wages. On 3 May the match against Brentford was cancelled by the EFL and a 1–0 result and three points awarded to Brentford.

In May the club went into administration due to a £1.2m unpaid tax bill. Fildraw (former owner Eddie Davies' trust fund) appointed administrators from insolvency firm David Rubin and Partners. In accordance with league rules on administration, Bolton would start the 2019–20 season with a 12-point deduction. On 14 May it was reported that some non-playing staff were forced to use food bank donations from local businesses and a local Championship club, believed to be Preston North End, as Bolton had not paid them for April's work. A 17 July statement from the Bolton players said that no-one at the club had been paid by owner Ken Anderson for 20 weeks, the training ground had no potable drinking water nor hot water for showers. Pre-season friendlies with Chester, Preston and Oldham Athletic were all cancelled as Bolton could not give assurances about fielding a competitive team.

Season summary 

On 18 July, Anderson said the sale of Bolton would be completed by the end of the week, but the uncertainty continued into August. Bolton started their opening League One game on 3 August at Wycombe Wanderers with only three contracted senior outfield players, and lost 2–0. The following week, on 8 August, Bolton's takeover by Football Ventures was suspended after Laurence Bassini, who had previously tried to buy the club, won a court order blocking the sale; the sale of the Bolton Whites hotel was also delayed by a dispute. On 10 August, Bolton fielded its youngest ever side, with an average age of 19, in a goalless home draw against Coventry City, but then conceded five goals in both of the next two games, against Rochdale in the EFL Cup (5-2) and Tranmere Rovers in League One (5-0). Manager Phil Parkinson expressed concern about the welfare of the youth players used in all of Bolton's games; such concerns led Bolton to call off the game against Doncaster Rovers on 20 August but without informing either Doncaster or the EFL. Parkinson and assistant Steve Parkin resigned the following day. The club confirmed that academy manager Jimmy Phillips would take temporary charge of the club. Wanderers lost 5–0 at home to Ipswich Town in Phillips' first game in charge of Bolton, in front of a record low crowd at the University of Bolton Stadium.

An EFL deadline of 5PM BST on 27 August had been imposed on Bolton to prove their financial viability under current ownership or complete a takeover deal, with failure to satisfy this criteria by the deadline resulting in Bolton's EFL membership being revoked, and consequently the beginning of a liquidation process of the club and its assets. However, on 26 August, joint administrator Paul Appleton announced that the Football Ventures takeover had fallen through on the morning of 24 August, having looked close to completion the previous day. After Bolton failed to meet 27 August deadline, the suspension of its notice of withdrawal from the EFL was lifted; however, the club was not immediately expelled from the EFL - it was given until 12 September 2019 to meet all outstanding requirements of the League's insolvency policy.

On 28 August, Bolton announced that the club's sale to Football Ventures (Whites) Limited had been completed, with the administrator paying tribute to the Eddie Davies Trust and their legal team, and criticising Anderson who had "used his position as a secured creditor to hamper and frustrate any deal that did not benefit him or suit his purposes." On 31 August, shortly after Bolton lost a fourth consecutive game conceding five goals in each, Keith Hill was announced as the new club manager. Bolton's first game under Hill saw the club lose 6–1 to Rotherham United, before picking up their first point under Hill on 17 September 2019 in a 0–0 draw at home to Oxford United. Bolton won their first game of the season on 22 October 2019 in a 2–0 win away at Bristol Rovers, before winning a further three consecutive matches in all competitions, taking the club to a positive points total for the first time.

Bolton struggled to find form throughout the 2019-20 campaign, winning just 5 of their 34 matches up to 10 March. The EFL League One season was suspended on 13 March due to the ongoing COVID-19 pandemic. On 9 June, the season was ended with promotion, play off, and relegation positions determined on a points-per-game basis.

This condemned the club to relegation and Bolton Wanderers will compete in the 2020-21 League Two campaign.

This will be only the second time in the club's 146-year history that they have played football in England's fourth tier. The previous occasion came in the 1987-88 campaign, in which Bolton were promoted back to the third tier at the first attempt.

Pre-season
Like the season before against St Mirren, the Bolton first team refused to play the match against Chester due to unpaid wages. They also refused to play in the Preston game as well. Following this, Oldham Athletic cancelled a third game as Bolton could not give assurances about fielding a competitive team. Bolton were able to schedule last minute replacements matches against Bradford City and Salford City, though the matches had to be played behind closed doors.

Kits

Competitions

EFL League One

Bolton Wanderers will begin the 2019–20 campaign with a 12-point deduction complying with league rules for entering into administration.

League table

Results summary

Results by matchday

Matches
On 20 June 2019, the League One fixtures for the forthcoming season were announced. Bolton begin their league campaign at Wycombe Wanderers, the first time the clubs have ever met in the league, on 3 August and were due to finish it away at Oxford United on 3 May. However this fixture, like all fixtures beginning with the home fixture against Peterborough United on 14 March, was postponed due to the COVID-19 pandemic.

FA Cup

The first round draw was made on 21 October 2019 and Bolton were given a home tie against League Two side Plymouth Argyle. A first half goal from Callum McFadzean was enough to see the away side through and knock Bolton out of the competition at the first round stage for the first time in 30 years. It was also the first time in the club's existence that they had been knocked out of both senior domestic cup competitions at the first round stage.

EFL Cup

On 20 June 2019, the draw for the first round was made in London and Bolton were drawn away at North-West rivals Rochdale. The subsequent 5–2 defeat was the club's second first round defeat in a row and their fourth in five years.

EFL Trophy

On 9 July 2019, the pre-determined group stage draw was announced with invited clubs to be drawn on 12 July 2019. The draw for the second round was made on 16 November 2019 live on Sky Sports.

Squad

Out on loan

Statistics

|-
! colspan="14" style="background:#dcdcdc; text-align:center"| Goalkeepers

|-
! colspan="14" style="background:#dcdcdc; text-align:center"| Defenders

|-
! colspan="14" style="background:#dcdcdc; text-align:center"| Midfielders

|-
! colspan="14" style="background:#dcdcdc; text-align:center"| Forwards

|-
! colspan="14" style="background:#dcdcdc; text-align:center"| Player(s) out on loan

|-
! colspan="14" style="background:#dcdcdc; text-align:center"| Player(s) who left the club

|}

Goals record

Disciplinary record

Transfers

Transfers in

Loans in

Loans out

Transfers out

References

Bolton Wanderers F.C. seasons
Bolton Wanderers